Sex Education is a British comedy-drama streaming television series created by Laurie Nunn for Netflix. It follows the lives of the students, staff and parents of the fictional Moordale Secondary School as they contend with various personal dilemmas, often related to sexual intimacy. The series stars an ensemble cast that includes Asa Butterfield, Gillian Anderson, Ncuti Gatwa, Emma Mackey, Connor Swindells, Kedar Williams-Stirling, Alistair Petrie, Mimi Keene, and Aimee Lou Wood.

The first series was released on 11 January 2019, the second on 17 January 2020, and the third on 17 September 2021. A fourth series was announced on 25 September 2021, likely to be released in mid 2023.

Sex Education has received critical acclaim for its ensemble cast, writing, directing, production values, and mature treatment of its themes. The programme has been a viewership success, with over 40 million viewers streaming the first series after its debut. Wood won the BAFTA TV Award for Best Female Comedy Performance for her role in the second series and the third series won Best Comedy Series at the 50th International Emmy Awards.

Premise
Sex Education primarily follows Otis Milburn, a student at Moordale Secondary School. Otis begins the series ambivalent about sex, in part because his single mother, Jean, is a sex therapist who frequently has affairs with male suitors but does not maintain romantic relationships.

Other students at Moordale include Eric Effiong, Otis's best friend and the gay son of Ghanaian-Nigerian immigrants; Maeve Wiley, a highly intelligent, rebellious teen whose independence is overshadowed by her family's troubled past; Adam Groff, the headmaster's son who develops a bullying nature out of his own self-loathing; Jackson Marchetti, the head boy struggling to meet the high expectations set for him; Ruby Matthews, Anwar Bakshi, and Olivia Hanan, members of a popular clique known as "the Untouchables"; Aimee Gibbs, an Untouchable who secretly befriends Maeve; and Lily Iglehart, a writer of alien erotica who is determined to lose her virginity. The school is later joined by Ola Nyman, whose widowed father, Jakob Nyman, begins a relationship with Jean.

In the first series, Otis sets up a sex therapy clinic with Maeve to help the students of Moordale with their sexual problems. Their business becomes a success, but conflict arises when Otis finds himself becoming attracted to Maeve.

In the second series, new students arrive and challenge the status quo at Moordale, including Ola, who becomes Otis's first girlfriend. Eric helps his former bully Adam come to terms with his sexuality. Jean becomes the school's resident sex therapist as a chlamydia outbreak causes the teens to question and struggle with topical issues.

In the third series, a new school year begins as Otis enters a relationship with Ruby, Jean expects a baby in the near future, Eric and Adam are made official, and new headmistress Hope Haddon's plans for a major revamp at Moordale cause an extra set of complications for the students.

Cast and characters

Main
 Asa Butterfield as Otis Milburn, a socially awkward teenager who gives sex advice to his peers
 Gillian Anderson as Jean Milburn, Otis's mother and a well-known sex therapist who is frank about all aspects of sexuality
 Ncuti Gatwa as Eric Effiong (series 1–4), Otis's openly gay best friend, who comes from a religious Ghanaian-Nigerian family
 Emma Mackey as Maeve Wiley (series 1–4), an intelligent but troubled teenager who befriends Otis and runs a sex therapy clinic with him
 Connor Swindells as Adam Groff, the headmaster's son and Eric's bully-turned-love interest
 Kedar Williams-Stirling as Jackson Marchetti, the head boy at Moordale Secondary School and a swimming champion
 Alistair Petrie as Michael Groff, the headmaster at Moordale Secondary School and Adam's strict father
 Mimi Keene as Ruby Matthews, a popular mean girl and the leader of the school's Untouchables clique
 Aimee Lou Wood as Aimee Gibbs, a former member of the Untouchables who becomes friends with Maeve
 Chaneil Kular as Anwar Bakshi, a member of the Untouchables
 Simone Ashley as Olivia Hanan (series 1–3), a member of the Untouchables
 Tanya Reynolds as Lily Iglehart (series 1–3), an eccentric girl who writes alien erotica
 Mikael Persbrandt as Jakob Nyman, a widowed Swedish plumber who develops a relationship with Jean
 Patricia Allison as Ola Nyman (series 1–3), Jakob's pansexual daughter
 Anne-Marie Duff as Erin Wiley (series 2-3), Maeve, Sean and Elsie's absent mother who reappears
 Rakhee Thakrar as Emily Sands (series 3; recurring series 1–2), an English teacher at Moordale Secondary School
 Jemima Kirke as Hope Haddon (series 3), the new headmistress at Moordale Secondary School and Michael Groff's replacement

Recurring
 Jim Howick as Colin Hendricks, a science teacher at Moordale Secondary School who conducts the Swing Band
 Samantha Spiro as Maureen Groff, the headmaster's wife and Adam's mother
 DeObia Oparei as Abeo Effiong, Eric's concerned and protective father (series 1)
 Conor Clarke McGrath as Conor Pearson, a student at Moordale Secondary School with an addiction to masturbating
 Armin Karima as Malek Amir, Olivia Hanan's boyfriend 
 Lisa Palfrey as Cynthia, the owner of the caravan park where Maeve lives
 Jojo Macari as Kyle, one of Aimee's ex-boyfriends
 James Purefoy as Remi Milburn, Otis's father and Jean's ex-husband, a therapist and sex addict who lives in America (series 1–2)
 Hannah Waddingham as Sofia Marchetti, one of Jackson's mothers (series 1–2; guest series 3)
 Joe Wilkinson as Jeffrey, Cynthia's husband
 Sharon Duncan-Brewster as Roz Marchetti, Jackson's other mother (series 1–2)
 Chris Jenks as Steve Morley, a student at Moordale Secondary School, who becomes Aimee's boyfriend
 Edward Bluemel as Sean Wiley, Maeve's absent older brother who raised her instead of their parents (series 1)
 Doreene Blackstock as Beatrice Effiong, Eric's supportive mother
 Sami Outalbali as Rahim Harrack, a French exchange student who shows an interest in Eric (series 2–3)
 George Robinson as Isaac Goodwin, a disabled boy who lives on the same campsite as Maeve (series 2–3)
 George Somner as Joe Goodwin, Isaac's brother and carer who lives on Maeve's campsite (series 2–3)
 Chinenye Ezeudu as Vivienne Odusanya, a girl who tutors Jackson and is a member of the quiz team (series 2–)
 Lino Facioli as Dex Thompson, a member of the quiz team (series 2–3)
 Mirren Mack as Florence, an asexual student at Moordale Secondary School (series 2)
 George Georgiou as Yousef, the owner of the local shop and Rahim's uncle (series 2)
 Conor Donovan as Quentin, an over-dramatic member of the drama club and enemy of Mr Hendricks (series 2–3)
 Jason Isaacs as Peter Groff, older brother of Michael Groff (series 3)
 Indra Ové as Anna, foster mother of Maeve's younger half-sister Elsie (series 3)
 Dua Saleh as Cal Bowman, a non-binary student at Moordale Secondary School who relocated from Minneapolis (series 3-)
 Robyn Holdaway as Layla, a non-binary student at Moordale Secondary School (series 3)
 Andi Osho as Nicky Bowman, Cal's mum (series 4)

Guest
 Toby Williams as Tim, one of Jean's patients (series 1–2)
 Lu Corfield as Sarah, a mother of three who befriends Maeve (series 1)
 Anjana Vasan as an anti-abortion activist (series 1)
 Dominic Applewhite as Charlie, an anti-abortion activist (series 1)
 T'Nia Miller as Maxine, the chair of the school board (series 2)
 Thomas Atkinson as Nick, Anwar's boyfriend (series 2–3)
 Stephen Fry as himself, a quiz host (series 2)
 Sindhu Vee as Mrs Hanan, Olivia's mother (series 2)
 Susan Lynch as Tara Gibbs, Aimee's mother (series 2)
 Jack Bandeira as Eli, student at Mountview Military Institution (series 2)
 David Layde as Roland Matthews, Ruby's father who has multiple sclerosis and Jeffrey's friend (series 3)
 Miles Jupp as an obstetrician at Moordale community hospital (series 3)
 Sophie Thompson as Carol Iglehart, Lily's mother and a nurse (series 3)
 Jerry Iwu as Oba, a gay photographer from Nigeria (series 3)
 Reece Richards as Eugene, Viv's boyfriend (series 3)

Episodes

Series 1 (2019)

Series 2 (2020)

Series 3 (2021)

Production

Development
On 28 November 2017, it was announced that Netflix had given the production a series order. The series was created by Laurie Nunn, with Ben Taylor expected to direct. Executive producers were set to include Jamie Campbell and Joel Wilson via their production company Eleven Film. On 4 December 2018, it was announced that the series would premiere on 11 January 2019. On 1 February 2019, Netflix renewed the show for a second series which premiered on 17 January 2020. On 10 February 2020, Netflix renewed the show for a third series. As part of a video and letter to its shareholders in April 2021, Netflix's co-chief executive officer and chief content officer, Ted Sarandos, confirmed that the third series of Sex Education was expected to be released sometime in the second half of 2021. On 24 June 2021, it was announced that the third series would premiere on 17 September 2021. On 25 September 2021, eight days after the premiere of the third series, it was announced that Sex Education had been renewed for a fourth series.

Casting
On 17 May 2018, it was announced that Gillian Anderson, Emma Mackey, Asa Butterfield, Ncuti Gatwa, Connor Swindells, and Kedar Williams-Stirling had joined the show's main cast. On 16 July 2018, it was reported that James Purefoy had been cast in a recurring role.

Filming

Filming for the first series took place at several locations in the Wye Valley in both Wales and England, including Llandogo, Tintern, Symonds Yat,  Monmouth, and Redbrook. Filming was also progressed in Penarth, Vale of Glamorgan during 2018. The scenes set at Moordale Secondary School were filmed at the former campus of the University of South Wales in Caerleon, Newport. Scenes set in the swimming pool were filmed at the Newport International Sports Village complex. Filming for the second series took place from May to September 2019 including scenes in the Forest of Dean. 
In February 2021 during filming for the third series production visited several locations in Kent. Filming took place at Shorncliffe Military Cemetery in Sandgate and The Hawthorne Trench which both double as WWI locations in France for Episode 5. Production also visited the Harbour Arm in Folkestone Harbour to film a scene for Episode 7.

Setting and aesthetics
The setting of Sex Education appears to be modern-day Britain, in the fictional village of Moordale, with various elements that serve to place the show in an uncertain time and location. Modern technology, such as smartphones, exists, but the show features very few cars from after the 1990s, with most cars featured ranging from the 1970s to the 1990s. Police cars seen during the finale of series two appear to follow 1990s aesthetics rather than modern-day police cars. The show heavily features older technologies such as CRT televisions and dated household appliances. The décor of the Groffs' house is reminiscent of popular 1970s décor; Maeve's caravan is typical of the 1990s–2000s; and the Milburns' house is a more modern décor with a modern, "American-style" fridge. Moordale Secondary School shows some elements of UK secondary schools but also has a more American high school image. According to showrunner Laurie Nunn, the show's aesthetic is deliberate and a homage to the 1980s films of John Hughes.

Release
On 2 January 2019, the official trailer for the series was released.

Audience viewership
On 17 January 2019, Netflix announced that the series was on pace to have been streamed by over 40 million viewers within its first month of release.

According to Netflix Top 10 global viewership, Sex Education was watched for over 447,750,000 hours between 12 September and 24 October 2021.

Manga adaptation
On July 15, 2022, a manga adaptation illustrated by John Tarachine began serialization in Kadokawa Corporation's Comic Bridge online manga magazine.

Reception

Critical response

Series 1
Review aggregation website Rotten Tomatoes reports that 91% of 80 critic ratings were positive for the first series, with an average rating of 8.10/10. The website's critical consensus reads, "Bawdy, heartfelt, and surprisingly wise, Sex Education is a raucous romp through a group of teenagers whose sexual misadventures are so thoughtfully rendered, adults could learn a thing or two from them." Metacritic calculated a weighted average score of 79 out of 100 from 19 critics, indicating "generally favourable reviews".

In a positive review, IndieWires Liz Shannon Miller gave the series a grade of "A−" saying, "Again, though, it's the kids' story, with the fluctuations in both friendships and relationships pinging back and forth with youthful verve. Sex Education does a lot of things really well, chief amongst them being the creation of a high school world which feels fully developed — realistic to a degree, but.. [with] a sense of escapism." The Daily Mirrors Lewis Knight awarded it a rating of five out of five, noting that with "a talented ensemble and explicit tackling of sexuality in young people (and their parents)", it "is an hilariously honest and refreshingly diverse comedy". The New York Timess James Poniewozik described the series as "timely but not hamfistedly topical, feminist, with a refreshing lack of angst about its subject. Sex, in this show, isn't an 'issue' or a problem or a titillating lure: It's an aspect of health".

In a mixed assessment, The Washington Posts Hank Stuever wrote, "there's the usual problem of Netflix drift for an episode or two midway through, where the plot dawdles while the writers and producers figure out an ending. Yet there's an artfulness to the material and a genuine care on display here, too — a message that we are not just about the size and shape and inventive uses of our private parts". In a negative review, The Independents Ed Power gave the series a rating of two out of five and criticised it, saying, "Sex Education suffers further for not being grounded in a distinctive time and place...Eager to please but confused, Sex Education could do with a stint on the therapist's couch itself".

Ncuti Gatwa, who plays gay black teen Eric Effiong, has received praise from critics and cultural commentators, who noted his role was not relegated to the cliché of a gay or black "best friend" stock character.

The series gained acclaim for its treatment of intimate content and use of an intimacy coordinator, Ita O'Brien.

Series 2
On Rotten Tomatoes, the second series has an approval rating of 98% with an average rating of 8.30/10, based on 57 reviews. The critical consensus reads, "Sex Educations sophomore season definitely has more going on, but by treating each new subject with care and humour, it leaves plenty of space for its characters to grow." On Metacritic, the series has a score of 83 out of 100, based on reviews from 11 critics, indicating "universal acclaim".

Series 3
On Rotten Tomatoes, the third series has an approval rating of 98% with an average rating of 8.50/10, based on 42 reviews. The critical consensus reads, "With a seemingly endless desire to dive deeper into its characters paired perfectly with its talented ensemble, Sex Education's third season is a masterclass in brutally honest, brilliantly heartfelt comedy." On Metacritic, the series has a score of 83 out of 100, based on reviews from 11 critics, indicating "universal acclaim".

The third series won Best Comedy Series at the 50th International Emmy Awards.

Awards and nominations

References

External links
 
 

2010s British comedy-drama television series
2010s British LGBT-related comedy television series
2010s British LGBT-related drama television series
2010s British sex comedy television series
2010s British teen television series
2010s high school television series
2010s teen drama television series
2020s British comedy-drama television series
2020s British LGBT-related comedy television series
2020s British LGBT-related drama television series
2020s British sex comedy television series
2020s British teen television series
2020s high school television series
2020s teen drama television series
2019 British television series debuts
2022 manga
British high school television series
British teen drama television series
Coming-of-age television shows
English-language Netflix original programming
Gay-related television shows
Lesbian-related television shows
Sex education television series
Television series about teenagers
Television shows filmed in England
Television shows filmed in Wales
Television series by Sony Pictures Television
Virginity in television
Bisexuality-related television series
Male bisexuality in fiction